Guairá is a department in Paraguay. The capital is the city of Villarrica.

One can arrive there by taking the Number 8 Blas Garay Road. It was founded on May 14, 1570, by Ruiz Diaz de Melgarejo.

History 
Until circa the 19th century, the departmenti was called La Guayra or Guairá, or also La Pineria (meaning "the Cury forests"); the region was under the jurisdiction of Cabildo de Asunción on the east of the Paraguay River until the line of the Tratado de Tordesillas. This place was also site of the first great Jesuit mission of Guayra, having the borders around the northern limits, the Paranapanema River, or according to other versions, the Tiete River, and the Iguazu River on the south.

It used to be called Guayra o Guaira, a large territory that currently corresponds to the state of Parana. From the 16th to 18th centuries, the Spanish founded cities (Ontiveros, Ciudad Real del Guayra, Villa Rica del Espiritu Santo), and the Jesuits founded some reservations, also under the Spanish jurisdiction, such as San Ignacio Guazu, Santa Maria del Iguazu
(which is today Foz do Iguacu) Pirapo, Loreto, etc.

Such cities were devastated by the bandeirantes, and they had to migrate a great part of the population to the west of the Parana River (where Villa Rica was re founded-the current-day Villarica) or to the south of the Iguazu River (where San Ignacio was re founded-with the name of San Ignacio Mini and Loreto among others).

The Guayra Waterfall (or Salto Canendiyu), called Salto das Sete Quedas by the Brazilians, on the Paraná River, almost to the crossing with the parallel 24ªS, was the natural navigation limit of the river. The current-day Paraguayan city called Salto del Guaira, and the Brazilian Guaira, indicate the approximate place where the beautiful and famous waterfalls are, covered by the waters of the Itaipu Dam since the 1980s.

The Brazilian occupation of the Guairá region was decided in 1870, at the end of the Paraguayan War, being later baptized with the name of Guaira, to the small department located in the center of the Eastern Region, in a territory which was not included in the original Guayra.

Location 
The departament is in the central area of the Eastern Region, whose name comes from guai: boys and ra: place, and is one of the richest and most fertile departments of the country. Its border to the north is the department of Caaguazu, to the east Caaguazu and Caazapa, to the south Caazapa and to the west is the department of Paraguari. A branch of the Caaguazú hills enter into the department, going from East to West, receiving the name Monte Rosario. On the far west forms the Villarica or Ybytyruzu hills. The department has 17 districts. The last one, Doctor Bottrell, was created in 1983.

Districts 
The department is divided in the following 18 districts:

 Borja
 Mauricio José Troche
 Independencia
 Coronel Martínez
 Dr. Botrell
 Félix Pérez Cardozo
 General Eugenio A. Garay
 Itapé
 Iturbe
 José Fassardi
 Mbocayaty
 Natalicio Talavera
 Ñumí
 Paso Yobai
 San Salvador
 Villarrica
 Yataity
 Tebicuary

Geography 

In the department there are three natural zones that are very well differentiated. The first zone, near the Villarica or Ybyturuzu, hills, there are high lands and forests that are woody with steep slopes. The second zone, the central west, has fertile lands. In the southwest part one can find the third zone, the most fertile and populated area. Its large plains are good for raising cattle. Besides the Ybyturuzu hills, we can also find the hills of Pelado, Polilla, Itape, Leon, Cerrito and Tres Kandú, with 848 m, the highest peak in the country. The Guaira is surrounded by the Tebicuary River and its tributaries, like the Tebicuari-mi with many streams such as the Yhaca Guazu, Yhaca-mi, Aguapety, Guazu, and Tacuaras. Also, the Pirapo-guazu River and the Pirapo-mi stream are found in the area. In other zones of the department, we can find the Bobo, Orory, Mitaì, Caundy, Doña Juana and Paso Pindo streams.

Weather 

The department has mild and good weather, with an average temperature of 21 degrees Celsius. In the summer, the maximum temperature is 38 degrees, and in the winter, the temperature goes down to 1 degree. It rains a lot during October and November. During the year, there is a total of 1,537 millimetres of rain.

Demography 

Out of a total of 161,991 inhabitants, 47,300 lived in the areas, and 114,691 in rural areas.

History 
The history of the department is intimately linked to the foundation and history of its main city, Villarrica. The city of Villarrica del Espiritu Santo was founded by Ruy Diaz de Melgarejo on May 14, 1570, in ancient Guaira, which today is in Brazilian territory. After being persecuted and the attacked by the Bandeirantes, the city suffered a migratory process which took people to seven different sites before finally being established in 1682 near the Ybyturuzu River, where it is currently located.

The Franciscan missionaries helped with the process of consolidation, and in 1686 they founded a Guarani reservation in the Itape zone. In 1906, the fifth department was created, composed of Villarrica in addition to Itape, Hiaty, Mbocayaty and Yataity. During the 20th century, there was great exploitation of the forest as well as the Yerba mate in the zone, which is closely linked to the rich region of the Caaguazú Department. Villarrica became a very important urban center, as the train crossed from East to West through a great part of the department's territory, which contributed as a means of communication in the department's development.

Flag 

The flag is divided in two horizontal zones of similar dimensions. The upper zone, a light blue, is related to the water and the sky; the lower zone, a red, symbolizes the grapes. The colors also reconfirm the range and category of the Catholic Church's supreme hierarchies.

Shield 

The shield is divided into four parts, where there is a typical colonial-style house, and the zone's landscape, which includes the Ybyturuzu mountains, grapes and the sugar cane plant. There is also a book, with the Roman numerals corresponding to the department of Guaira. Also, one can see shapes referring to nature. In the center of the shield there is a butterfly, which is a reference to panambi. The bottom of the shield says "Tradition Culture".

Economy 

Guairá is a predominantly agricultural department. It is the country's most important sugar cane producer, with 41% of the national output; it is also the main producer of Paraguayan wine. Other crops include cotton, soybean, maize, vegetables and fruits. The indiscriminate felling of the forests has reduced the forest activity; nevertheless, the department possesses sawmills and factories for cabinet-making etc. The industrial activity is marked by vintners, herbal mills, alcohol distilleries, footwear industries, scale factories, dairy industries and tanneries.

Communication ways 

The Departament contains the Number 8 Blas Garay Road, which starts in Coronel Oviedo from the Number 2 and 7 Roads, and is paved until Caazapa. From the Ñumi district there is another paved part that connects to San Juan Nepomuceno. It also has other paved roads: Villarica–Paraguari, through Felix Perez Cardozo and Coronel Martinez, Mbocayati-Independencia, with an extension of 50 km, and another way that connects the Number 7 Road through Natalicio Talavera, Troche and Colonia Blas Garay. Guaira also has aerial communication, telephones and telegraphs. There are many roads that cross the territory in all directions.

Education 

From the founding of the city of Villarrica del Espíritu Santo, work on education began and hasn't stopped since. Starting in 1585, the Franciscans opened a convent in the city of Santa Barbara, and elementary and secondary schools were attached. In the 17th century, the Paraguay province had free courses in grammar, Philosophy and Sanctity in Asunción and Villarica, under the direction of the Franciscan, Dominican, Merced, and Jesuit priests.

The first teaching center, sustained by the state of Villarica, dates back to 1859, and was named Escuela Patria. Nowadays, the superior education in the department is represented by Universidad Católica "Nuestra Señora de la Asunción," and Universidad Nacional de Asunción in the north. In Guairá, there are many schools and institutes, private as well as public, such as Colegio Nacional, Colegio Ortiz Guerrero, Colegio Tecnico Vocacional, Seminario Diocesano, Escuela Regional de Agricultura, Instituto Professional Femenino, Escuela de Artes and Oficios Pio XII.

There are also various pre-school centers and Humanistic high schools, as well as Technical ones. Another educational entity is the Institute of Guaraní Linguistics, Idelguap, which teaches the Guarani language, literature, and folklore. There is also, with similar goals, the Ateneo of Guaraní Language and Culture and Guaraní Roga.

Art and culture 

The main guaireña city, Villarrica, is considered the largest city in the department. Among the social, cultural and sports entities, there are "The Porvenir Guaireño," " El Centro Español," "El Club de Leones," " Instituto de Cultura Hispánica," "Teatro Municipal," "Orquesta de Cámara," "Escuela Municipal de Danzas, Declamación, Oratoria, Guitar," "Asociación de Productores de Caña de Azúcar," "Liga Guaireña de Fútbol" y " Liga Guaireña de Basquetbol."

In 1970, the Socioeconomical Development Center of Guaira was created, formed by public and private entities, which supports the department's economic, social and cultural development. The Ybyturuzu Foundation, an environmental organization, attempts to spread consciousness throughout Guairá's population to keep, protect and defend the important ecosystem of the area.

In the city there are a few radio stations, closed circuit television, cable TV and channel 8. In terms of their intangible culture, the guireños keep a repertoire of different popular myths and legends, such as pora, pombero, jasy jatere, kurupi, urutau, karau, and jakare, among others. Among the European traditions, they have the patronal parties, day of the cross, corridas de toros, horse races, and riñas de gallos.

Tourism 

Guairá has one of the most emblematic and representative cities of the Paraguayan culture: Villarica.

In Villarica, nature is a friend and trusts the human beings who live there, or the ones who are attracted by its fame for being a paradise and who decide to wander about its geography, to know its history and to drink from its culture. One of the most widely visited places in the city is the Manuel Ortiz Guerrero Park, which before 1936 was known as Ycua Pyta. Here you can feel the soul of Villarica like no other place in the city. The calm nature of the place helps one to forget the activities of daily life. It is an ideal place for the soul and the body. The Manuel Oritz Guerrero Park is located in the northeast area of the city, between the Ybaroty and San Miguel neighborhoods.

At the beginning of the 1960s a sculpture was made by Javier Baez Rolon to commemorate a Villariquean poet. On May 8, 1983, for the 50th anniversary of the poet's death, his ashes were moved to the park, fulfilling the citizens' dream. From that day on, under the shadow of a tree, the poet rests in peace in the land of his soul. His poetry still vibrates under the look of his beloved Ybytyruzu.

Other cultural centers that one must visit are the Maestro Fermin Lopez Museum and the Library, where one can find the personal belongings of Natalicio Talavera, Fermin Lopez, and Manuel Ortiz, as well as weapons from the Chaco War, a collection of coins and Paraguayan bills, and arrows and axes made by the native peoples. In the museum one can see, among others, very old objects, old furniture, old machines, paintings, photographs, and different sacred art donated by the Church of Villarica. In the district of Itape there is a sacred place named the "Paso de la Virgen," whose festival is celebrated on December 18. Its sanctuary on the side of the Tebicuary-mi River is visited by thousands of pilgrims during the year.

Another tourist attraction is the Cristal Waterfalls, which are 43 meters high. Below the waterfalls there are many different colored fish, and a beautiful forest surrounding them. On the Tororo hill one can see runic inscriptions, said to be from the Vikings from the Pre-Columbian times. Lovers of the ao poi embroideries can enjoy beautiful samples in the Mbocayaty and Yataity districts.

Notable people 
Ruy Díaz de Guzmán (1554–1629) Bold conqueror. Son of the province of Guaira. Founder of towns. Considered the first national historian. Grandson of Don Domingo Martínez de Irala, first governor of Paraguay. Representative of the joining of two civilizations; the Spanish and the Guarani.
Manuel Ortiz Guerrero  (1899–1933) The biggest and most widely known of the guaireños poets. He was born, lived, and died as a poet. He made the poetry the reason for his life. His poetry has entered to the depths of the national soul. The guaireñan land gave him its aroma and charm, and he gave back his poetry, transformed into light. His life was an example of dignity, struggle and correction.
Natalicio de María Talavera (1839–1867) Initial figure of the Paraguayan parnassus. He was a representative of the true intellectuals in moments when the poetry in Paraguay was just beginning. His work is presented under the form of scattered fragments. The Paraguayan War ate up a great part of it. Talavera was not a poet with an easy and simple life. He lived the tragedy of the nation, and sang to it with a great feeling and depth.
Ramón Indalecio Cardozo  (1877–1943) Teacher and supporter of a new educational system, where the children developed in an honest environment. He was also a supporter of the New School Era. Between 1921 and1934, and as a recognition of his sacrifice and work towards the teaching in his native town Villarica, he finally occupied the Presidency of the National Council of Education and the General Direction of Schools.
Efraím Cardozo (1909–1973) He was known as the richest and most systematic Paraguayan historian. He was a journalist, writer, professor and politician. He represented Paraguay in key moments of its history, such as the signing of the treaty of Peace and Borders with Bolivia. He published many books on Paraguayan history.
Félix Pérez Cardozo  (1908–1953)  He was born in the town of Yhaty, today known as Felix Perez Cardozo, as a homage to the important Harp player. He learned to play the harp from anonymous older harpists from his region. His special quality of playing an instrument, together with his strong personality, gave him the chance to visit cultural centers in different countries: Argentina, Uruguay, Chile. He was considered the richest composer in Paraguay. He created 87 musical compositions, among them polcas, guaranias, songs, galopas, milongas, zambas, cuecas, boleros, tangos and chacareras.
Nadia Ferreira (born May 10, 1999) She won Miss Paraguay Universe 2021 and placed as first runner-up at the international beauty contest, Miss Universe 2021.

Bibliography 

 Geografía Ilustrada del Paraguay. Tercera Edición. Distribuidora Quevedo de Ediciones. Buenos Aires.1998.
 Atlas y Geografía de Paraguay y el Mundo. Ediciones India Guapa. Asunción. 1997.
 Atlas Paraguay. Cartografía Didáctica. Fausto Cultural Ediciones. Enero 2000.
 Franco Preda, Artemio. El Guairá y su aporte a la cultura paraguaya. Editora Litocolor S.R.L. Villarrica,2003

References

External links 

 Secretaria Nacional de Turismo